Stanley Grant Holloway (born November 19, 1997) is an American hurdler and sprinter. He is the 2020 Tokyo Olympic silver medalist in the 110 meters hurdles, the 2019 and 2022 World champion, and the second-fastest man in history at the event with a personal best of 12.81 seconds, set at the U.S. Olympic Trials on June 26, 2021. In the 60 meters hurdles, Holloway is the 2022 World Indoor champion and the world indoor record holder with a time of 7.29 seconds set in Madrid, Spain on February 24, 2021. 

Despite being a hurdler, he showed incredible versatility whilst competing for the University of Florida, by also doing the flat races, relays and long jump. His incredible range was a driving force in Florida's team performances at the NCAA Championships. In the six NCAA Championships Holloway competed in between 2017 and 2018, Florida won three and finished second in the other three. As of February 2023, he hadn't lost an indoor sprint hurdles race since March 2014, when he was 16 years old.

Early life
Stanley Grant Holloway was born November 19, 1997 in Chesapeake, Virginia to mother Latasha and father Stan. Holloway was coached with his older brother Trey by their father Stan in track and field until high school as members of the Track 757 club. Holloway continued to compete in track and field with his brother at Grassfield High School for the Grizzlies, as well as competing on the football team as a wide receiver. He chose to compete for the University of Florida in the hurdles rather than the University of Georgia in football.

Career

Collegiate

2017
Holloway showed incredible range by competing in the long jump and the 4x400m relay, in addition to his hurdles specialty. He went undefeated in the 60m high hurdles, and won the NCAA Indoor Title in a collegiate-leading 7.58 seconds. He also finished 11th in the long jump and ran the second leg on Florida's 4x400m relay team that finished 2nd. Outdoors, he won the 110m hurdles, finished 2nd in the long jump and anchored Florida's 4x400m relay team to 4th place. He also ran the 3rd leg on their 4x100m team throughout the season. Holloway competed in the US Championships in the hopes of qualifying for the World Championships in London, but finished 4th and missed out by .05 seconds.

2018
Holloway's 2018 season was a repeat of 2017. He continued his unbeaten streak in the 60m high hurdles, defending his NCAA title in a collegiate record-breaking and world leading 7.42 seconds. This year, he finished 2nd in the long jump and Florida finished 3rd in the 4x400m relay with his help on the second leg. Outdoors, he set a then-world-leading 13.15 seconds in the 110m hurdles at the SEC Championships, and defended his NCAA title 4 weeks later. He finished 9th in the long jump, ran the 2nd leg on the 4x100m team that finished 3rd, and anchored Florida to 4th place in the 4x400m. He once again went to the US Championships, this time finishing 2nd by thousandths of a second.

Prior to setting the NCAA and American record in the 60 m hurdles, in February 2018 he set the NCAA record with a 7.42 s clocking at the Clemson Tiger Paw Invitational, beating and taking the record away from Olympic champion in the 110 m hurdles Omar McLeod. Later that year he clocked 13.15 s in the 110 m hurdles at the Southeastern Conference (SEC) Championships, winning the meet in the second fastest time in NCAA history. This became the third fastest time a year later at the same meet when Holloway ran 13.07 s, just 0.07 s slower than Renaldo Nehemiah's NCAA record.

2019

2019 was Holloway's breakthrough year. Despite finding strong challenge from Daniel Roberts of the University of Kentucky, he went unbeaten in the 60m high hurdles and won his 3rd consecutive NCAA title in the event, becoming the first to do so. He also smashed his own collegiate record with 7.35 seconds, also an American record.

He was one of the most versatile athletes in the NCAA, setting personal bests of 6.50 s in the 60 m dash, 12.98 s in the 110 m hurdles, 8.17 m in the long jump, and a 43.75 s split in the  relay while competing for the Florida Gators. He holds the NCAA and American record in the 60 m hurdles with a time of 7.35 s, set at the NCAA Division I Indoor Championships. This mark also made him the third-fastest man in the event in history. His NCAA record of 12.98 s in the 110 m hurdles, set at the NCAA Division I Championships, broke 40-year-old record held by former world record holder Renaldo Nehemiah. He was a member of the championship and record breaking  relay team at this championships, which clocked the first sub-38 relay in NCAA history with a time of 37.97 s.

Holloway was NCAA champion in both the 60 m hurdles and the 110 m hurdles from 2017 to 2019, champion in both the 60 m dash and 60 m hurdles in 2019, and had multiple podium finishes in the long jump,  relay, and  relay in the same years. His performances were critical in helping the Florida Gators win the team titles at the 2017 NCAA Division I Championships, the 2018 NCAA Division I Indoor Championships, and the 2019 NCAA Division I Indoor Championships.

Professional
Holloway set the 60 m hurdles world record on February 24, 2021 at the conclusion of the World Athletics Indoor Tour in Madrid, beating Colin Jackson's 27-year old world record of 7.30 s by one hundredth of a second. Holloway had previously matched his American record of 7.32 s in the heats, already the #2 all-time performance going into the meet, before winning the final in 7.29 s. His victory in the final also made him the overall winner of the 2021 World Indoor Tour in the 60 m hurdles.

He made his outdoor debut at the Miramar Invitational in Miramar, Florida on April 10, winning the 110 m hurdles final in a windy (+2.2 m/s) 13.04 s, his fastest opening performance in the event.

Awards and recognition
Holloway was one of three men's finalists in 2018 for The Bowerman—an annual American collegiate track and field award—and was the fan favorite by vote. The United States Track & Field and Cross Country Coaches Association (USTFCCCA) awarded him The Bowerman in 2019, and additionally named him both the Men's Indoor Track Athlete of the Year and the Men's Outdoor Track Athlete of the Year. Track & Field News awarded him both the U.S. Collegiate Men's Indoor Athlete Of The Year and the U.S. Collegiate Men's Outdoor Athlete Of The Year titles in 2019.

After setting the world record in the 60 m hurdles and having an undefeated indoor season in which he won the 2021 World Indoor Tour title, Holloway was runner-up for the Indoor Men's Athlete Of The Year title by Track & Field News.

Statistics

Information from World Athletics profile unless otherwise noted.

Personal bests

International championship results

Circuit wins
 World Indoor Tour Gold 60 m hurdles overall winner: 2021
 2021: Liévin, Toruń, Madrid
 2022: New York City, Liévin, Birmingham
 2023: Boston, Liévin

National championship results
  = personal best
  = seasonal best
  = world lead, fastest time in the world in a calendar year
  = collegiate record
  = national (American) record

NCAA results from Track & Field Results Reporting System.

Seasonal bests

Notes

References

External links

 (Track & Field Results Reporting System)
Grant Holloway bio at Florida Gators

Videos
Men's 60m Hurdles World Indoor Record - Grant Holloway | World Athletics Indoor Tour via World Athletics on YouTube
Grant Holloway's Hurdles Gold | World Athletics Championships 2019 | Doha Moments via World Athletics on YouTube
Grant Holloway breaks 40-year collegiate record, three-peats in 110m hurdles | 2019 via the NCAA on YouTube

1997 births
Living people
African-American male track and field athletes
American male sprinters
American male hurdlers
American male long jumpers
Track and field athletes from Virginia
Sportspeople from Chesapeake, Virginia
Florida Gators men's track and field athletes
United States collegiate record holders in athletics (track and field)
World Athletics Championships athletes for the United States
World Athletics Championships medalists
World Athletics Championships winners
World Athletics indoor record holders
USA Outdoor Track and Field Championships winners
Athletes (track and field) at the 2020 Summer Olympics
Medalists at the 2020 Summer Olympics
Olympic silver medalists for the United States in track and field
21st-century African-American sportspeople
World Athletics Indoor Championships winners